Hayling Island Lifeboat Station is a Royal National Lifeboat Institution station located on Hayling Island close to the town of Mengham in the English county of Hampshire. The station is located on the eastern side of Hayling island at the entrance to Chichester Harbour where it joins the major shipping route of the Solent, and is opposite the village of West Wittering. This major shipping route is busy at all times of the year and there are estimated to be 10,000 boats in the Chichester area alone. The Hayling Island station provides cover for the area 24 hours a day, all year, by means of two inshore rigid inflatable lifeboats placed on this station.

History

1865–1924: original station 

The Royal National Lifeboat Institution (RNLI) first opened a lifeboat station on Hayling Island in 1865 after a pair of marine incidents in 1862 and 1865 made it clear that regular lifeboat coverage was required at Hayling. In each incident, local fishermen had been required to step in and rescue the crews of wrecked vessels, despite lacking proper lifesaving equipment and training. In February 1865, a location was found for a boathouse and an order placed for a self-righting lifeboat for Hayling. The station was officially opened on 13 September 1865 with the naming of the new lifeboat called , was blessed by the Bishop of Chichester Ashurst Gilbert. The first boathouse was built at a cost of cost of £259 10s 0d and was used until 1913. The original structure is still standing, although not in its original form: it has been incorporated into a structure used as a public house and restaurant.

In 1914 a new lifeboat, the Rubie-class , was allocated to Hayling. As she was larger than the previous two lifeboats, a new boathouse was required. The new boathouse was built two miles to the east of the original, at a cost of £900. 

The original all-weather lifeboat service at Hayling island operated for a total of 59 years until closure on 15 May 1924. The RNLI decided to close the station as the neighbouring stations at Selsey to the south-east, and Bembridge to the south west on the Isle of Wight, both operated more modern and faster motor lifeboats which, by the 1920s, were deemed to be more effective given the shipping patterns and the type of vessels now operating in the Solent. The 1914 boathouse still stands on the seafront and today is used by the Army cadets.

1966–1980: private lifeboat station and re-opening 

By the 1950s, increased use of pleasure craft along the Hayling coastline had led to a corresponding increase in marine incidents which required lifeboat services. In 1966, a local man and his two sons started an unofficial rescue service and patrol on the island, using an old RNLI inflatable to patrol the coast and provide faster local response times. The fledgling service was run from a caravan located next to the coastguard station. A Land Rover was used to launch the boat and the lifeboat was powered with a 40 hp Evinrude outboard motor. Their tiny organisation became part of the Shore Boat Rescue Scheme, an RNLI-recognised scheme.

This independent service formalised in 1971 as the Hayling Island Sea Rescue and Research Organisation (HISRrO), which launched for rescue services and undertook patrols along the area's coast and inland estuaries. It also researched rescue procedures and methods for divers. In 1975 the HISRrO and the RNLI agreed to operate a joint service and in 1975 the partnership began operating from a new boathouse at Sandy Point. The RNLI placed an Atlantic 21 Inshore Life Boat (ILB) on station. The two organisations worked alongside each other until 1978, when they agreed to discontinue their joint association. Sole administration for the station and service was taken over by the RNLI. HISRrO continued to operate independently after the split until closing in August 1992.

In 1980, launch facilities at the boathouse were improved with the installation of a launch ramp. In November 1980 the station also received a new Atlantic 21 inshore lifeboat, the first to be designed and built for the Hayling Island station.

2004–present: hovercraft and new station 

In June 2004 the RNLI sent a hovercraft, for trials at Hayling island.

Work began on an extensive refurbishment of the station in late 2006 to allow the placement of a new lifeboat, its A85 Do-Do launch carriage, and a launch tractor. The operated out of shipping containers temporarily placed on the station's car park during the rebuild. The new station, which incorporated the old structure, was completed in November 2007 and included a new boat hall with an upper storey. The new station was paid for from legacies of £500,000 from the Lusty family and £300,000 provided by Gwendoline Prince and the Hudson family.
The two current lifeboats are an  lifeboat and a  lifeboat. The Atlantic 85 inshore lifeboat is called Derrick Battle (B-829) and arrived on station on 26 February 2009. It is fitted with radar interlaced into the GPS system and VHF direction finding gear. The lifeboat is equipped with two 115 hp Yamaha outboard engines and has the capability of thirty five knots. The second lifeboat is a smaller D-class inflatable lifeboat and is called . It arrived on station in May 2005 and is an IB1 type boat powered by a 50 hp outboard engine giving her a top speed of twenty five knots.

Fleet

All Weather Boats

Inshore Lifeboats

B-class Lifeboats

D-class Lifeboats

References 

Lifeboat stations in Hampshire
Hayling Island